Judith Sims ( 1939March 25, 1996) was an American journalist, music critic, and magazine editor. She was the first editor of the rock magazine TeenSet in the 1960s. Later she was the Los Angeles bureau chief for Rolling Stone.

Career
Sims was the first editor of the rock magazine TeenSet in the 1960s, writing influential pieces about Buffalo Springfield and the Doors. For TeenSet she toured with the Beatles in 1966, and after TeenSet she worked publicity for Warner Bros. Records from 1969 to 1972. She contributed to the UK Melody Maker in the 1970s, and she was the Los Angeles bureau chief for Rolling Stone. She edited the college supplement Ampersand and the film review publication The Movie Magazine. She wrote pieces for the Los Angeles Times, the Los Angeles magazine, and The Washington Post.

Sims strongly advocated copyright protection for writers. She was the president of the Los Angeles chapter of the National Writers Union.

Personal life
Sims lived with her husband in Echo Park, Los Angeles, for two decades, then moved with him to Oregon in the early 1990s. She died of cancer in 1996 in Roseburg, Oregon, at the age of 56. 

Rolling Stone editor Ben Fong-Torres eulogized her, saying that she had taken TeenSet above the field of teen magazines to become "one of the first publications to reflect the social and musical changes of those times". He remembered how she and he "were partners on every level", flying back and forth between San Francisco and Los Angeles in the early 1970s, until June 1972 when she met her soon-to-be husband. Fong-Torres said that Sims gave him an early journalism platform at TeenSet along with music/film critic Jacoba Atlas (later a television executive producer) and rock journalist Jerry Hopkins. Music critic David Wagner, writing in 1968, agreed that Sims was "an intelligent, clear-eyed interpreter" of the music scene, improving TeenSet until it was the best teen magazine.

References
 

Year of birth missing
1996 deaths
20th-century American non-fiction writers
20th-century American women writers
American business executives
Journalists from California
American women journalists
Deaths from cancer in Oregon
Writers from Los Angeles
American magazine editors
Women magazine editors